Dennis Bligen (born March 3, 1962) is a former American football running back. He played for the New York Jets from 1984 to 1986 and in 1987 and for the Tampa Bay Buccaneers in 1986.

References

1962 births
Living people
American football running backs
St. John's Red Storm football players
New York Jets players
Tampa Bay Buccaneers players